This was the first edition played.

Mana Endo won in the final 6–1, 6–7, 6–4 against Rachel McQuillan.

Seeds
A champion seed is indicated in bold text while text in italics indicates the round in which that seed was eliminated.

  Shi-Ting Wang (second round)
  Larisa Neiland (first round)
  Ann Grossman (second round)
  Patricia Hy (second round)
  Linda Harvey-Wild (first round)
  Mana Endo (champion)
  Ginger Helgeson (quarterfinals)
  Inés Gorrochategui (first round)

Draw

External links
 1994 Tasmanian International Draw
 Main draw (WTA)

Singles
Hobart International – Singles